Francis Collins (born 1950) is an American physician-geneticist.

Francis Collins may also refer to:

Francis Dolan Collins (1841–1891), American politician
Francis Collins (Borris–Ileigh hurler) on Borris–Ileigh Hurling Team 1987
Francis Collins (hurler), Irish hurler

See also
Frank Collins (disambiguation)
Francis Collings, BBC journalist
Francis Collin (born 1987), English footballer
Frances Collins (1840–1886), British writer